The 1962–63 Cypriot Cup was the 21st edition of the Cypriot Cup. A total of 22 clubs entered the competition. It began with the first round on 12 May 1963 and concluded on 30 June 1963 with the final which was held at GSP Stadium. APOEL won their 5th Cypriot Cup trophy after beating Anorthosis 1–0 in the final.

Format 
In the 1962–63 Cypriot Cup, participated the teams of the Cypriot First Division and the teams of the Cypriot Second Division.

The competition consisted of five knock-out rounds. In all rounds each tie was played as a single leg and was held at the home ground of the one of the two teams, according to the draw results. Each tie winner was qualifying to the next round. If a match was drawn, extra time was following. If extra time was drawn, there was a replay match.

The cup winner secured a place in the 1963–64 European Cup Winners' Cup.

First round

Second round

Quarter-finals

Semi-finals

Final 

Because the match was drawn after extra time, a replay match was played.

Sources

Bibliography

See also 
 Cypriot Cup
 1962–63 Cypriot First Division

Cypriot Cup seasons
1962–63 domestic association football cups
1962–63 in Cypriot football